McVoy is a surname. Notable people with the surname include:

Carl McVoy (1931–1992), American pianist
Larry McVoy (born 1962), American computer programmer

See also
McAvoy
McCoy (surname)